is a former Japanese football player.

Playing career
Saito was born in Yamagata Prefecture on June 1, 1979. He joined Japan Football League club Montedio Yamagata from JEF United Ichihara youth team in 1998. The club was promoted to new league J2 League from 1999. However he could hardly play in the match behind Katsumi Suzuki until 2001. He played many matches in late 2002. However he could not play at all in the match behind Shigeru Sakurai in 2003 and retired end of 2003 season.

Club statistics

References

External links

1979 births
Living people
Association football people from Yamagata Prefecture
Japanese footballers
J2 League players
Japan Football League (1992–1998) players
Montedio Yamagata players
Association football goalkeepers